Dobby Gibson (born 1970) is an American poet. His first book of poetry, Polar, (Alice James Books, 2004) won the 2004 Beatrice Hawley Award and was a finalist for the 2006 Minnesota Book Award. He is also author of Skirmish (2009) It Becomes You (2013), and Little Glass Plane (2019), all published by Graywolf Press.

Gibson's poetry has appeared in Ploughshares, Fence, Iowa Review, New England Review, American Poetry Review, Conduit, among others publications. He is the recipient of a poetry fellowship from the McKnight Foundation.  Born in Minneapolis, Minnesota, he earned a B.A. from Connecticut College in 1993 and an M.F.A. from Indiana University in 1997. He lives in St. Paul, Minnesota.

Published works

References

External links
All Things Considered Interview
Poetry Foundation Biography
Review: Dobby Gibson's Polar: Grab That Line and Hold On > by Erin Marsh
Audio: Dobby Gibson Reading at Prairie Lights Bookstore
Audio: Dobby Gibson' ''Fishousepoems" Page
2005 Minnesota Writers Career Initiative Grants
No Surrender
 Dobby Gibson reads for the Poem of the Day Podcast from InDigest

21st-century American poets
Connecticut College alumni
Indiana University alumni
1970 births
Living people